Molly Williams (fl. 1818) was the first known female, and first known black firefighter in the United States.

An African American, she was a slave of the New York City merchant Benjamin Aymar. She was affiliated with the Oceanus Engine Company #11 in lower Manhattan. During her time in the company, she was called Volunteer No. 11. Williams made a distinguished presence in her sturdy work clothes of calico dress and checked apron  Her service was noted particularly during the blizzard of 1818. Male firefighters were scarce due to a cholera outbreak, but Williams took her place with the men on the dragropes and pulled the pumper to the fire through the deep snow.

When asked, Williams always replied: "‘I belongs to ole ‘Leven; I allers runs wid dat ole bull-gine.’"  

She was born in 1750

Notes

Further reading
 Story book for young children

See also
Lillie Hitchcock Coit

Year of birth missing
Year of death missing
American firefighters
Women in firefighting
History of firefighting
History of women in the United States
19th-century American slaves
History of New York City
African-American firefighting organizations
19th-century African-American women